High School Rapper is a South Korean Hip hop survival television show.

Contestants
In the first episode, Jang Yong-jun from regional Seoul - Gangdong dropped out because of center controversy about prostitution and drinking

Color key

Note :
* mean the contestant save in wildcard challenge
** mean the contestant winner

Note: in Cypher battle of contestants who ranked 6th in preliminary round, Mark Lee and MC Gree (Lee Dong-hyun) received the same number of votes, therefore they both ranked 2nd in Cypher battle.

Cypher battle round (Episode 3 & 4)
Color key

Final regional representative (Episode 4)
The final regional representative tournaments are held in 1: 1: 1 confrontation, and the mentor selects one successful candidate.

Regional competition (Episode 5 & 6)

Seoul - Gangseo vs. East Gyeongin

Gwangju - Jeolla vs. Busan - Gyeongsang

Seoul - Gangdong vs. West Gyeongin

Wildcard challenge

1 vs. 1 (Episode 7)

Final round (Episode 8)

Notes

References

High School Rapper contestants
High School Rapper